Sousa is a municipality in the state of Paraíba in the Northeast Region of Brazil.

It lies in the region called  the Valley of the Dinosaurs, which contains a protected area containing dinosaur tracks.
The municipality established the Valley of the Dinosaurs Natural Monument, a fully protected area, in 2002.

Sports
Sousa Esporte Clube is the municipality's football club.

See also
List of municipalities in Paraíba

References

External links

Municipalities in Paraíba